Apapacho is a Canadian drama film, directed by Marquise Lepage and released in 2019. The film centres on Karine (Laurence Leboeuf) and Estelle (Fanny Mallette), two sisters on a trip to Mexico to participate in a Day of the Dead ritual honoring and mourning the recent suicide of their sister Liliane (Eugénie Beaudry).

The film opened in theatres on October 18, 2019.

References

External links
 

2019 films
Canadian drama films
Films shot in Quebec
Films shot in Mexico
Films set in Mexico
Films directed by Marquise Lepage
2019 drama films
French-language Canadian films
Spanish-language Canadian films
2010s Canadian films